British Library, Add MS 14455 is a Syriac manuscript of the New Testament, on parchment. Palaeographically it has been assigned to the 6th century. It is a manuscript of the Peshitta. The manuscript is very lacunose.

Description 

It contains the text of the four Gospels, on 135 parchment leaves (14 ¾ by 11 ¾ inches), with large and numerous lacunae (Matthew 1:1-8:32; 9:11-35; 10:22-11:4; 11:19-14:17; 14:30-22:2; 22:16-23:25; 23:35-fin.; Mark 1:1-12:43; 13:10-21; 13:34-14:66; Luke 8:29-39; 9:14-36; 10:12-17; 12:25-46; 13:19-14:16; 15:4-16:5; 19:23-22:24; 22:58-23:35; 24:17-29; John 4:10-23; 4:47-5:5; 12:37-49; 13:9-fin.). Some of leaves are much stained and torn. The manuscript is in imperfect condition.

Written in two columns per page, in 15-21 lines per page. The writing is a large, beautiful Estrangela. The Eusebian Canons are marked in the text with the red ink. Some lessons are rubricated in the text, and many margin notes were added by a later hand.

The manuscript is housed at the British Library (Add MS 14455) in London.

See also 

 List of the Syriac New Testament manuscripts
 Syriac versions of the Bible
 Biblical manuscript
 Codex Phillipps 1388
 British Library, Add MS 12140

References

Further reading 

 William Wright, Catalogue of the Syriac manuscripts in the British Museum (1870; reprint: Gorgias Press 2002).

External links 

 William Wright, Catalogue of the Syriac manuscripts in the British Museum

Peshitta manuscripts
6th-century biblical manuscripts
Add. 14455